The  is a suspension bridge on the Kobe-Awaji-Naruto Expressway connecting Minamiawaji, Hyogo on Awaji Island with Naruto, Tokushima on Ōge Island, Japan. Although it is one of the largest bridges in the world, it is dwarfed by the Akashi-Kaikyo Bridge, which is on the same route. In 2004, 6.8 million cars and trucks crossed this bridge, translating into a daily average of about 18,600.

The bridge is complemented by the Konaruto Bridge ("Small Naruto Bridge") and Muya Bridge between Ōge Island and Shikoku.

When the bridge was built, space was left for the proposed Shikoku Shinkansen; however, no progress has been made on the train line, so the space intended originally for the bullet trains is used as an observatory to see the whirlpools beneath the bridge. It’s also a popular tourist destination for fans of the Naruto anime where it was referenced in episode 19 of the first season.
.

Naruto Whirlpools

Recurring whirlpools known as the Naruto whirlpools are located below the bridge, caused by tidal currents between the Seto Inland Sea and the Pacific Ocean passing over undersea ridges under the Span, causing very strong eddy currents, some of which make large, deep whirlpools.

The bridge has a tourist attraction built into the south side anchor—the Uzunomichi Walkway—an enclosed walkway out to the south tower to allow visitors to view the swirls through side and floor windows, best seen during low tide. Tourist boats and other vessels circle the towers, allowing visitors to actually see the depth of the whirlpools up close, while the view from the bridge observatory lets visitors see the pattern created by the eddy currents extending out for quite a distance.

References

External links
 
Honshu Shikoku Bridge Expressway Company
Welcome! Shikoku — Naruto Whirlpools English Page

Suspension bridges in Japan
Bridges completed in 1985
Naruto, Tokushima